Caroline Barbey-Boissier (4 August 1847, in Geneva – 18 January 1918, in Pregny-Chambésy) was a Swiss botanist, author and translator.  She was the daughter of botanist Pierre Edmond Boissier.

Written works
 Herborisations au Levant −1882 (in French), co-written with her husband William Barbey
 La comtesse Agénor de Gasparin et sa famille: Correspondance et souvenirs 1813–1894, Volume 1 – 1902 (in French)

References

External links
Papers of the Boissier Family (in French)

19th-century Swiss botanists
19th-century Swiss women scientists
1847 births
1918 deaths